is an upcoming mixed-media project witten by Takahiro and created by Egg Firm and Bandai Namco Filmworks, with original character designs by Mika Pikazo. An anime television series by Lerche is set to premiere in April 2023, and a mobile game titled World Dai Star: Yume no Stellarium will be released in Summer 2023.

Characters

Sirius

Gingaza

Koyomi Senju

Gekidan Denki

Iroha Senju

Eden

Hatsumi Renjakuno

Media

Manga
A manga adaptation illustrated by Nanafuji will begin serialization on Media Factory's Comic Alive+ website in April 2023.

Anime
An anime television series by Lerche is set to premiere on April 9, 2023 on Tokyo MX and other networks,

Mobile game
A mobile game titled World Dai Star: Yume no Stellarium will be released in Summer 2023.

References

External links
Project official website 
Game official website 
Anime official website 

2023 manga
2023 anime television series debuts
Bandai Namco franchises
Japan-exclusive video games
Japanese role-playing video games
Lerche (studio)
Media Factory manga
Mobile games
Seinen manga
Theatre in anime and manga
Tokyo MX original programming
Upcoming anime television series
Upcoming video games scheduled for 2023
Video games developed in Japan